The , also known as the . There was a highly complex version of historical significance known as the Han Chinese clothing and was typically worn by royalty to signify aristocracy and nobility, as well as the commoners.

Construction and design 
The  was a historically significant Han Chinese garment. It is a robe with a wrap collar closing to the right side.

In the 17th and 18th century, the  worn by men was an ankle-level gown which could be used as part of a formal attire; it was composed of four-panel of fabric and was loose-fitting and featured a  collar, loose sleeves, and side slits. It was typically not decorated and black in colour. The women's  were also a non-decorated, four panel of fabric, loose fitting gown, similar to those worn by men.

History

Prior to 18th Century 

18th Century 
The áo ngũ thân then became the official clothing for both men and women in the South of Vietnam.

19th Century 
In the 19th century, under the rule of Emperor Minh Mạng (r. 1820-1841), the clothing in Vietnam was finally standardized throughout the entire country when Emperor Minh Mạng decreed that the áo ngũ thân had to become the standardized national dress for all the regions under his rule. The áo ngũ thân thus became the daily clothing of the Vietnamese.

21st Century 

In the 21st century,  worn in the 15th century was depicted in a book titled Weaving a Realm published by the Vietnam Centre (a non-profit organization which aims to promote the culture and image of Vietnam). The authors of the book mostly consisted of dress makers, artists, stylists, photographers, proof readers and editors (but lacked the presence of historians and archeologists) attempted to reconstruct the ancient clothing worn by Vietnamese through extensive historical research. However, due to the lack of funds, the reconstructed clothing were not made with original materials or techniques.

Gallery

See also
Áo viên lĩnh, round neck.
Áo trực lĩnh, parallel splints.
Garment collars in Hanfu
Ru (upper garment) 
Chang'ao
Paofu
Ruqun

References

External links
 Đi tìm ngàn năm áo mũ
 Ancient Costumes of Vietnam

Vietnamese clothing
Vietnamese words and phrases
History of Asian clothing